Charles Augustus Carlow FRSE (30 November 1878 – 13 August 1954) was a Scottish mining engineer and owner and managing director of the Fife Coal Company Ltd., that was based in Leven, Fife.

Life

Carlow was born at 2 Links Place in Leven, Fife on 30 November 1878 to Mary Weatherstone (née Lindsay; 1851-1929), daughter of William Lindsay, a shipowner, and Charles Carlow (1849-1923) a mining engineer.   He studied mining technology at Heriot-Watt College and the University of Edinburgh.

In 1952 he was awarded an honorary doctorate (LLD) from the University of St Andrews. He died in St Andrews in Fife on 13 August 1954.

Family

He was the maternal grandson of William Lindsay FRSE (1819-1884).

He was first cousin to Sir Charles Carlow Reid co-author with his son, Sir William Reid of the "Reid Report" on the state of British coal-mining.

Benefactions

In 1927 he gave Blair House and 27 acres of ground near Culross in Fife to serve as a convalescent home for elderly and injured miners. The home is named for him as Charles Carlow Miners Convalescent Home.

Positions held
See
 Deputy Lieutenant of Fife.
Managing Director of the Fife Coal Company Ltd
Chairman of Shotts Iron Company
Chairman of Fife and Clackmannan Coal Owners Association
President of the Institute of Mining Engineers
President of the Mining Institute of Scotland
Fellow of the Institute of Fuel
Fellow of the Royal Society of Edinburgh
President of the Association of Mining Electrical Engineers
Chairman of the Transport Committee of Scottish Coal Owners

References

1878 births
1954 deaths
People from Leven, Fife
Fellows of the Royal Society of Edinburgh
Scottish mining engineers
Scottish businesspeople
Alumni of Heriot-Watt University
Alumni of the University of Edinburgh
Scottish philanthropists